Audrey Poetker (born 1962) is a Canadian poet and translator from New Bothwell, Manitoba.

Career

Born in Steinbach, Manitoba, Poetker grew up in a Mennonite home in rural Manitoba. She began publishing poetry in the 1980s and is the author of three volumes of poetry: i sing for my dead in german (1986), standing all the night through (1992) (writing as Audrey Poetker-Thiessen) and Making Strange to Yourself (1999), all published by Turnstone Press. standing all the night through was a finalist for the McNally Robinson Book of the Year Award. Along with Di Brandt her work is considered an important early example of secular Mennonite poetry and, along with Armin Wiebe, she is noted for the use of untranslated Plautdietsch (Mennonite Low German) words within her texts. 

Poetker was married to lexicographer Jack Thiessen from 1991 until his death in 2022, with whom she has translated Bern G. Langin's The Russian Germans Under the Double Eagle and the Soviet Star into English.

References

Mennonite writers
Canadian Mennonites
Writers from Steinbach, Manitoba
20th-century Canadian poets
Canadian women poets
Mennonite poets
1962 births
Living people